A still life is a work of art depicting inanimate subject matter.

Still Life, The Still Life, or Still Lives may also refer to:

 :Category:Still life paintings
 Still Life (Rufino Tamayo), a 1954 mural by Rufino Tamayo
 Still life photography
 Still life (cellular automaton), an unchanging pattern in a cellular automaton
 Still Life (video game), a 2005 video game

Film and television

Film
 Still Life (1974 film), an Iranian film directed by Sohrab Shahid Saless
 Still Life, a 1999 short film featuring Agnes Bernelle
 Still Life (2006 film), a Chinese film directed by Jia Zhangke
 The Still Life, a 2006 film by Joel A. Miller
 Still Life (2007 film), a Filipino film by Katski Flores
 Still Life (2013 film), a British film directed by Uberto Pasolini
 Still Life (2014 film), an Argentinian thriller film by Gabriel Grieco

Television
 "Still Life" (CSI), a 2005 episode
 "Still Life" (The Dead Zone), a 2005 episode
 "Still Life" (Medium), a 2005 episode
 "Still Life" (The Twilight Zone), a 1986 episode
 Still Life, an unaired 2003 series starring Jensen Ackles

Literature
 Still Life (Byatt novel), a 1985 novel by A. S. Byatt
 Still Life (Penny novel), a 2005 novel by Louise Penny
 Still Life, a 2009 novel by Joy Fielding
 The Still Life, a novel by David Chase
 "Still-Life", a short story by Barry N. Malzberg (writing as K.M. O'Donnell), included in the 1972 anthology Again, Dangerous Visions
 "Still Lives", a short story by Ian Potter in the 2002 Doctor Who anthology Short Trips: Zodiac
 Still Life, a panel cartoon by Jerry Robinson

Music
 Still Lives, a 1993 composition by Nicolas Collins

Performers
 Still Life (1970s UK band), a progressive rock band, or their self-titled album
 Still Life (US band), an emo/emocore band, or several self-titled singles and split albums

Albums
 Still Life (American Standards album) or the title song, 2012
 Still Life (Annie Haslam album) or the title song, 1985
 Still Life (Aqualung album), 2003
 Still Life (The Connells album) or the title song, 1998
 Still Life (Dukes album), 2010
 Still Life (Fates Warning album), 1998
 Still Life (Kevin Morby album), 2014
 Still Life (The Listening Pool album) or the title song, 1994
 Still Life (Opeth album), 1999
 Still Life (The Paradise Motel album), 1996
 Still Life (Rolling Stones album), 1982
 Still Life (Van der Graaf Generator album) or the title song, 1976
 Still Life (Talking), by the Pat Metheny Group, 1987
 The Still Life (album), by Alessi's Ark, 2013
 Still Life, by Antischism, 1991
 Still Life, by Kodomo, 2008

Songs
 "Still Life" (song), by Big Bang, 2022
 "Still Life", by Covenant from United States of Mind, 2000
 "Still Life", by Dala from Best Day, 2012
 "Still Life", by the Horrors from Skying, 2011
 "Still Life", by Iron Maiden from Piece of Mind, 1983
 "Still Life", by Men at Work from Two Hearts, 1985
 "Still Life", by Nefilim from Zoon, 1996
 "Still Life", by Oneohtrix Point Never from R Plus Seven, 2013
 "Still Life", by Redgum from Frontline, 1984
 "Still Life", by Suede from Dog Man Star, 1994

Theatre
 Still Life (play), a 1936 play by Noël Coward
 Still Life (Byrne play), a 1982 play in the Slab Boys Trilogy by John Byrne
 Still Life, a 2007 play by Emily Mann

See also
 Naturaleza muerta (disambiguation)